Ovarian cancer G-protein coupled receptor 1 is a protein that in humans is encoded by the GPR68 gene.

See also
Proton-sensing G protein-coupled receptors

References

Further reading

G protein-coupled receptors